DB120 may refer to:

DB Class 120, a class of railway locomotive operated by Deutsche Bahn
John Deere DB120, type of tractor manufactured by John Deere